The AEG SUT 264 is a German 21 inch heavyweight wire-guided torpedo produced by Atlas Elektronik which entered service in 1967.

Description 
SUT stands for Surface and Underwater Target. It is a dual-purpose weapon that can be launched from surface ships, submarines, and shore positions.

Mod 2
The SUT Mod 2 has been compared favorably to the Chinese Yu-4 and Yu-6.

Production 
A production line was set up in Indonesia with the cooperation of the Indonesian Navy and Indonesian Aerospace to produce the SUT under license. Taiwan received 200 torpedoes from this production line in 1998.

Service history

Chile 
In 2004 the Chilean  O'Higgins fired a SUT while running at depth during its acceptance tests off Lorient, France.

India 
In 2013 OEM Atlas Elektronik was contracted to upgrade the 64 SUTs remaining in Indian service.

The SUT was the first torpedo fired by the  because of a lack of procurement of planned heavyweight torpedoes. A planned purchase of Black Shark torpedoes fell through because their manufacturer Finmeccanica was blacklisted by the Indian government for procurement corruption.

Taiwan 
The SUT was originally procured along with the two Hai Lung-class submarines. The torpedoes were procured from the Indonesian production line. In addition to money Taiwan exchanged landing craft and 100,000 tons of rice for the torpedoes.

On September 4, 2003 a war shot SUT fired by a submarine during the Hankuang No. 19 training exercise broke its control wires and went out of control. The torpedo was recovered four hours later from a Yilan County beach. Representatives of the manufacturer traveled to Taiwan to participate in the incident investigation. On October 8 the Navy tested a second torpedo with satisfactory results. On October 14 the Navy held a full test in Pingtung County, the first torpedo experienced similar problems to the one on September 4 but the issue was resolved and a second torpedo successfully destroyed the target, a decommissioned Yang-class destroyer.

In 2010 the Taiwanese Navy offered a reward to local fishermen for the recovery of a training SUT lost during an exercise. The SUT will be replaced by the Mk 48 torpedo in Taiwanese service.

Users
 Chilean Navy
 Colombian Navy
 Ecuadorian Navy
 Egyptian Navy
 Hellenic Navy
 Indian Navy
 Indonesian Navy
 South Korean Navy
 South African Navy
 Republic of China Navy
 Peruvian Navy

See also 
SST torpedo

References 

Torpedoes of Germany
Military equipment introduced in the 1960s